Hopeland can mean:

Australia 

Hopeland, Queensland, a locality in the Western Downs Region, in Australia
Hopeland, Western Australia, a suburb of Perth

United States 
 Hopeland, Pennsylvania